Courland is one of the five multi-member constituencies of the Saeima, the national legislature of Latvia. The constituency was established in 1922 when the Saeima was established following Latvia's independence from the Soviet Union. It consists of the cities of Liepāja and Ventspils and municipalities of Kuldīga, Saldus, South Kurzeme, Talsi and Ventspils in the region of Courland. The constituency currently elects 12 of the 100 members of the Saeima using the open party-list proportional representation electoral system. At the 2022 parliamentary election it had 180,070 registered electors.

Electoral system
Courland currently elects 12 of the 100 members of the Saeima using the open party-list proportional representation electoral system. Constituency seats are allocated using the Sainte-Laguë method. Only parties that reach the 5% national threshold compete for constituency seats (4% in 1993).

Election results

Summary

Detailed

2020s

2022
Results of the 2022 parliamentary election held on 1 October 2022:

The following candidates were elected:
Arvils Ašeradens (JV), 21,556 votes; Uldis Augulis (ZZS), 27,941 votes; Inga Bērziņa (JV), 21,267 votes; Artūrs Butāns (NA), 12,739 votes; Gundars Daudze (ZZS), 27,199 votes; Atis Deksnis (AS), 27,182 votes; Ilze Indriksone (NA), 14,148 votes; Māris Kučinskis (AS), 28,269 votes; Linda Matisone (AS), 27,312 votes; Ramona Petraviča (LPV), 6,334 votes; Jānis Vucāns (ZZS), 26,348 votes; and Edgars Zelderis (PRO), 6,519 votes.

2010s

2018
Results of the 2018 parliamentary election held on 6 October 2018:

The following candidates were elected:
Valērijs Agešins (SDPS), 12,036 votes; Arvils Ašeradens (JV), 6,985 votes; Uldis Budriķis (JKP), 16,472 votes; Gundars Daudze (ZZS), 17,199 votes; Ilze Indriksone (NA), 14,592 votes; Juris Jurašs (JKP), 20,393 votes; Janīna Kursīte-Pakule (NA), 15,266 votes; Ramona Petraviča (KPV LV), 23,569 votes; Juris Pūce (AP), 13,655 votes; Ēriks Pucens (KPV LV), 23,213 votes; Jānis Vucāns (ZZS), 15,525 votes; and Atis Zakatistovs (KPV LV), 26,094 votes.

2014
Results of the 2014 parliamentary election held on 4 October 2014:

The following candidates were elected:
Valērijs Agešins (SDPS), 15,442 votes; Ringolds Balodis (NSL), 9,535 votes; Aija Barča (ZZS), 46,578 votes; Gaidis Bērziņš (NA), 27,668 votes; Ints Dālderis (V), 23,648 votes; Gundars Daudze (ZZS), 45,796 votes; Jānis Junkurs (V), 23,767 votes; Nellija Kleinberga (LRA), 7,013 votes; Janīna Kursīte-Pakule (NA), 24,886 votes; Inese Lībiņa-Egnere (V), 24,215 votes; Dana Reizniece-Ozola (ZZS), 51,070 votes; Valdis Skujiņš (ZZS), 42,825 votes; and Jānis Vucāns (ZZS), 43,296 votes.

2011
Results of the 2011 parliamentary election held on 17 September 2011:

The following candidates were elected:
Solvita Āboltiņa (V), 25,060 votes; Valērijs Agešins (SC), 21,767 votes; Aija Barča (ZZS), 31,179 votes; Gaidis Bērziņš (NA), 22,557 votes; Inita Bišofa (ZRP), 33,702 votes; Edmunds Demiters (ZRP), 32,874 votes; Andrejs Elksniņš (SC), 17,526 votes; Jānis Junkurs (ZRP), 32,906 votes; Dzintars Kudums (NA), 19,228 votes; Janīna Kursīte-Pakule (V), 24,247 votes; Inese Lībiņa-Egnere (ZRP), 34,336 votes; Dana Reizniece-Ozola (ZZS), 31,367 votes; and Jānis Vucāns (ZZS), 29,809 votes.

2010
Results of the 2010 parliamentary election held on 2 October 2010:

The following candidates were elected:
Solvita Āboltiņa (V), 45,797 votes; Valērijs Agešins (SC), 22,946 votes; Aija Barča (ZZS), 42,650 votes; Silva Bendrāte (V), 39,254 votes; Gaidis Bērziņš (NA), 10,730 votes; Ingrīda Circene (V), 40,349 votes; Gundars Daudze (ZZS), 46,170 votes; Valērijs Kravcovs (SC), 17,307 votes; Janīna Kursīte-Pakule (V), 42,849 votes; Dana Reizniece (ZZS), 41,386 votes; Jānis Vucāns (ZZS), 41,405 votes; Edgars Zalāns (PL), 11,682 votes; and Oskars Zīds (ZZS), 40,919 votes.

2000s

2006
Results of the 2006 parliamentary election held on 7 October 2006:

The following candidates were elected:
Valērijs Agešins (SC), 8,542 votes; Māris Ārbergs (TP), 31,912 votes; Aija Barča (TP), 32,075 votes; Silva Bendrāte (JL), 20,200 votes; Guntis Blumbergs (ZZS), 34,418 votes; Uldis Briedis (TP), 31,820 votes; Augusts Brigmanis (ZZS), 34,371 votes; Ingrīda Circene (JL), 22,332 votes; Gundars Daudze (ZZS), 34,064 votes; Uldis-Ivars Grava (JL), 19,405 votes; Pēteris Hanka (ZZS), 34,377 votes; Oskars Kastēns (LPP/LC), 8,688 votes; Jānis Lagzdiņš (TP), 34,191 votes; and Gunārs Laicāns (TB/LNNK), 8,109 votes.

2002
Results of the 2002 parliamentary election held on 5 October 2002:

The following candidates were elected:
Dzintars Ābiķis (TP), 37,749 votes; Valērijs Agešins (ЗаПЧЕЛ), 9,957 votes; Silva Bendrāte (JL), 38,732 votes; Ingrīda Circene (JL), 38,742 votes; Silva Golde (TP), 38,254 votes; Māris Grīnblats (TB/LNNK), 9,052 votes; Edgars Jaunups (JL), 38,396 votes; Pēteris Kalniņš (ZZS), 15,372 votes; Jānis Lagzdiņš (TP), 39,979 votes; Vineta Muižniece (TP), 37,007 votes; Leopolds Ozoliņš (ZZS), 15,558 votes; Andrejs Radzevičs (JL), 37,851 votes; Ainārs Šlesers (LPP), 20,318 votes; and Inese Šlesere (LPP), 19,902 votes.

1990s

1998
Results of the 1998 parliamentary election held on 3 October 1998:

The following candidates were elected:
Aija Barča (LSDA), 20,893 votes; Aivars Boja (LC), 24,571 votes; Leons Bojārs (LSDA), 21,090 votes; Guntis Dambergs (LC), 24,741 votes; Silva Golde (TP), 43,010 votes; Ģirts Valdis Kristovskis (TB/LNNK), 24,199 votes; Dzintars Kudums (TB/LNNK), 22,321 votes; Linards Muciņš (LC), 24,308 votes; Mareks Segliņš (TP), 42,562 votes; Jēkabs Sproģis (TP), 41,849 votes; Jānis Straume (TB/LNNK), 23,113 votes; Aivars Tiesnesis (TP), 41,942 votes; Ingrīda Ūdre (JP), 12,326 votes; and Vineta Uškāne (TP), 41,882 votes.

1995
Results of the 1995 parliamentary election held on 30 September and 1 October 1995:

The following candidates were elected:
Dzintars Ābiķis (LC), 25,051 votes; Edgars Bāns (LVP), 10,000 votes; Gunta Gannusa (TKL), 25,622 votes; Edmunds Grīnbergs (TKL), 25,741 votes; Aigars Jirgens (TB), 18,166 votes; Juris Kaksītis (DPS), 21,628 votes; Jānis Kalviņš (LNNK-LZP), 7,465 votes; Jānis Kazāks (TKL), 25,866 votes; Jānis Lagzdiņš (LC), 26,473 votes; Kristiāna Lībane (LC), 23,658 votes; Valdis Nagobads (DPS), 21,547 votes; Atis Sausnītis (DPS), 21,459 votes; Māris Vītols (LZS-KDS-LDP), 12,976 votes; and Roberts Zīle (TB), 17,738 votes.

1993
Results of the 1993 parliamentary election held on 5 and 6 June 1993:

The following candidates were elected:
Alfrēds Čepānis (DCP), 12,894 votes; Pēteris Cimdiņš (KDS), 7,441 votes; Ilmārs Dāliņš (TB), 15,659 votes; Pēteris Elferts (LC), Māris Graudiņš (LC), 70,594 votes; Andris Gūtmanis (LC), 70,180 votes; Juris Janeks (SL), 6,959 votes; Jānis Lagzdiņš (LC), 77,473 votes; Uldis Osis (LC), 70,647 votes; Oļģerts Pavlovskis (LC), 73,313 votes; Andris Rozentāls (LZS), 20,070 votes; Ivars Silārs (LC), 70,642 votes; Dainis Stalts (LNNK), 13,500 votes; and Jānis Ārvaldis Tupesis (LZS), 20,062 votes.

1930s

1931
Results of the 1931 parliamentary election held on 3 and 4 October 1931:

1920s

1928
Results of the 1928 parliamentary election held on 6 and 7 October 1928:

1925
Results of the 1925 parliamentary election held on 3 and 4 October 1925:

1922
Results of the 1922 parliamentary election held on 7 and 8 October 1922:

References

Saeima constituency
Saeima constituencies
Saeima constituencies established in 1922